Artyom Timofeyev may refer to:
 Artyom Timofeev (chess player) (b. 1985), Russian chess player
 Artyom Timofeyev (footballer) (b. 1994), Russian footballer